†Leucocharis loyaltyensis was a species of air-breathing land snails, terrestrial pulmonate gastropod mollusks in the family Bothriembryontidae.

Distribution
This species is endemic to New Caledonia.

References

External links
 S.M. & Montrouzier X. (1879). Descriptions d'espèces nouvelles de l'archipel calédonien. Journal de Conchyliologie. 27(1): 25-34
 Dautzenberg, Ph. (1923). Mollusques terrestres de la Nouvelle-Calédonie et des îles Loyalty. In: F. Sarasin & J. Roux, Nova Caledonia, Zoologie. 3 (1): 135-156.
 Franc A. (1957). Mollusques terrestres et fluviatiles de l'archipel néo-calédonien. Mémoires du Muséum National d'Histoire Naturelle de Paris. ser. A (Zoologie), 13: 1-200, 24 pls.
 Barker, G. M.; Brodie, G.; Bogitini, L.; Pippard, H. (2016). Diversity and current conservation status of Melanesian–New Zealand placostyline land snails (Gastropoda : Bothriembryontidae), with discussion of conservation imperatives, priorities and methodology issues. Pacific Conservation Biology. 22(3): 203

loyaltyensis
Extinct gastropods
Taxonomy articles created by Polbot